Paul Gustave Louis Christophe Doré (6 January 1832 – 23 January 1883) was a French artist, as a printmaker, illustrator, painter, comics artist, caricaturist, and sculptor. He is best known for his prolific output of wood-engravings, especially those illustrating classic books, including 241 illustrating the Bible. These achieved great international success, and he is the best-known artist in this printmaking technique, although his role was normally as the designer only; at the height of his career some 40 block-cutters were employed to cut his drawings onto the wooden printing blocks, usually also signing the image.

In all he created some 10,000 illustrations, the most important of which were "duplicated in electrotype shells that were printed ... on cylinder presses", allowing very large print runs as steel engravings, "hypnotizing the widest public ever captured by a major illustrator", and being published simultaneously in many countries. The drawings given to the block-cutters were often surprisingly sketch-like and free.

Biography

Doré was born in Strasbourg on 6 January 1832. By age 5 he was a prodigy artist, creating drawings that were mature beyond his years. Seven years later, he began carving in stone. At the age of 15, Doré began his career working as a caricaturist for the French paper Le journal pour rire. The illustrations of J. J. Grandville have been noted as an influence on his work. Wood-engraving was his primary method at this time. In the late 1840s and early 1850s, he made several text comics, like Les Travaux d'Hercule (1847), Trois artistes incompris et mécontents (1851), Les Dés-agréments d'un voyage d'agrément (1851) and L'Histoire de la Sainte Russie (1854). Doré subsequently went on to win commissions to depict scenes from books by Cervantes, Rabelais, Balzac, Milton, and Dante. He also illustrated "Gargantua et Pantagruel" in 1854.

In 1853 Doré was asked to illustrate the works of Lord Byron. This commission was followed by additional work for British publishers, including a new illustrated Bible. In 1856 he produced 12 folio-size illustrations of The Legend of The Wandering Jew, which propagated longstanding antisemitic views of the time, for a short poem which Pierre-Jean de Béranger had derived from a novel of Eugène Sue of 1845.

  
In the 1860s he illustrated a French edition of Cervantes's Don Quixote, and his depictions of the knight and his squire, Sancho Panza, became so famous that they influenced subsequent readers, artists, and stage and film directors' ideas of the physical "look" of the two characters. Doré also illustrated an oversized edition of Edgar Allan Poe's "The Raven", an endeavor that earned him 30,000 francs from publisher Harper & Brothers in 1883.

The government of France made him a Chevalier de la Légion d'honneur in 1861.

Doré's illustrations for the Bible (1866) were a great success, and in 1867 Doré had a major exhibition of his work in London. This exhibition led to the foundation of the Doré Gallery in Bond Street, London. In 1869, Blanchard Jerrold, the son of Douglas William Jerrold, suggested that they work together to produce a comprehensive portrait of London. Jerrold had obtained the idea from The Microcosm of London produced by Rudolph Ackermann, William Pyne, and Thomas Rowlandson (published in three volumes from 1808 to 1810). Doré signed a five-year contract with the publishers Grant & Co that involved his staying in London for three months a year, and he received the vast sum of £10,000 a year for the project. Doré was celebrated for his paintings in his day, but his woodcuts and engravings, like those he did for Jerrold, are where he excelled as an artist with an individual vision.

The completed book London: A Pilgrimage, with 180 wood engravings, was published in 1872. It enjoyed commercial and popular success, but the work was disliked by some contemporary British critics, as it appeared to focus on the poverty that existed in parts of London. Doré was accused by The Art Journal of "inventing rather than copying". The Westminster Review claimed that "Doré gives us sketches in which the commonest, the vulgarest external features are set down". But they impressed Vincent van Gogh, who painted a version of the Prisoners' Round in 1890, the year of his death. The book was a financial success, however, and Doré received commissions from other British publishers.

Doré's later work included illustrations for new editions of Coleridge's Rime of the Ancient Mariner, Milton's Paradise Lost, Tennyson's Idylls of the King, The Works of Thomas Hood, and The Divine Comedy. Doré's work also appeared in the weekly newspaper The Illustrated London News.

Death

Doré never married and, following the death of his father in 1849, he continued to live with his mother, illustrating books until his death in Paris on January 23, 1883, following a short illness. At the time of his death, he was working on illustrations for an edition of Shakespeare's plays.

Works
Doré was a prolific artist; thus the following list of works is not complete and it does not include his paintings, sculptures, and many of his journal illustrations:

Reception and legacy 

H.P. Lovecraft drew inspiration from Dore's Rime of the Ancient Mariner illustrations in his formative years.

Gallery

References

Further reading

(80 illustrations, earliest photogravures of Dore paintings)
(141 illustrations)
(138 illustrations)
(314 illustrations)
(103 illustrations)
(30 illustrations)
(521 illustrations, reprinting most of the Delorme photogravures)
(exhibition book: 591 illustrations)
(343 illustrations)
(500 illustrations)
 (exhibition book: 250 illustrations, 40 in full-color, sometimes incorrectly listed as, "40 b/w, 120 color illustrations")
 (catalog of the exhibition held at Musée d'Orsay and National Gallery of Canada, 335 pages)
 (annual listing of the books published in France)

External links

 
 
 
Gustave Doré Digital Collection of Illustrations from the University at Buffalo Libraries
 
 

1832 births
1883 deaths
19th-century engravers
Artists from Strasbourg
19th-century French painters
French Roman Catholics
French male painters
French illustrators
French engravers
French wood engravers
French caricaturists
French comics artists
French children's book illustrators
Burials at Père Lachaise Cemetery
19th-century illustrators of fairy tales
Woodcut designers
Painters from Alsace
Catholic painters
Catholic sculptors
Catholic engravers
19th-century French male artists